Kolhar (Old)  is a village in the southern state of Karnataka, India. It is located at the bank of river Krishna in the Kolhar taluk of Bijapur district.

Kolhar (Old) is popularly known for solid curd, tasty Fish as well as kind hearted peoples of Kolhar, in the region of North Karnataka, which is shifted to New Kolhar due to reserved back water of Alimatti dam.

Educational institutions

Due to a shift to new Kolhar, only few following institutions are active in Kolhar (Old).

1. Shree Sangameshwar P U College, Kolhar. 
2. Shree Sangameshwar D.ed. college, Kolhar.

Transportation

NH-218 Hubballi-Kalburgi is passed through This Kolhar.
Nearest railway station is Telagi or Basavan Bagewadi Cross, which is 25 km away from the Kolhar.

Demographics
 India census, Kolhar (Old) had a population of 11935 with 6074 males and 5861 females.

See also
 Bijapur district
 Districts of Karnataka

References

External links
 http://Bijapur.nic.in/

Villages in Bijapur district, Karnataka